West Hamburg is a census-designated place in Tilden Township, Berks County, Pennsylvania, United States.  It is located along Old US Route 22 and just west of Pennsylvania Route 61 near the borough of Hamburg.  The area is best known for having the biggest Cabela's store in the world.  As of the 2010 census, the population was 1,979 residents.

References

Populated places in Berks County, Pennsylvania